| tries = {{#expr:
 5 + 9 + 11 + 7 + 7 + 7
 + 7 + 6 + 7 + 8 + 3 + 8
 + 8 + 11 + 9 + 10 + 6 + 12
 + 6 + 13 + 5 + 9 + 9
 + 9 + 6 + 5 + 7 + 9
 + 7 + 8 + 10 + 8 + 7
 + 5 + 5 + 3 + 3
 + 9 + 7 + 11 + 7
 + 5 + 6 + 3 + 3
 + 4 + 6 + 5 + 11
 + 5 + 6 + 5 + 10
 + 4 + 7 + 7 + 7
 + 4 + 4 + 4 + 5 + 4
 + 6 + 4 + 5 + 1 + 8
 + 3 + 10 + 7 + 6 + 3
 + 8 + 3 + 5 + 5 + 10
 + 6 + 8 + 4 + 11 + 5
 + 3 + 7 + 12 + 6 + 6
 + 10 + 10 + 7 + 8 + 8
 + 10 + 5 + 5 + 7 + 11
 
 
 
 
 
 
 
 
}}
| top point scorer =  Paddy Jackson (London Irish) – 175 points
| top try scorer =  Mateo Carreras (Newcastle Falcons) – 12 tries
| website    = www.premiershiprugby.com
| prevseason = 2021–22
| nextseason = 2023–24
| teams = 13 (before 6 October 2022)12 (6–28 October 2022)11 (after 28 October 2022)
}}

The 2022–23 Premiership Rugby is the 36th season of the top flight of English domestic rugby union competition and the fifth to be sponsored by Gallagher. The competition will be broadcast by BT Sport for the tenth successive season, with six league season games and the final also simulcast free-to-air by ITV. Highlights of each weekend's games are to be shown on ITV with extended highlights on BT Sport.

The reigning champions entering the season are Leicester Tigers, who claimed their 11th league title after winning the 2022 final. No team was promoted as champions from the 2021–22 RFU Championship.

Due to changes to the global rugby calendar implemented in 2020 and to allow more time for preparation for the World Cup, the season will start and finish earlier than previous seasons and take place over a slightly reduced timeframe of 38 weeks.

On 26 September 2022, due to ongoing financial difficulties, Worcester Warriors were suspended from all tournaments. On 6 October 2022, it was announced that Worcester would be relegated from the Premiership, after the club was placed into administration and all player and staff contracts were terminated – their results were subsequently deleted from the Premiership's records.

On 12 October 2022, due to ongoing financial difficulties, Wasps were suspended from all tournaments. The club then entered administration on 17 October 2022 and their players and coaching staff were made redundant. On October 28, it was confirmed that Wasps had been suspended for the remainder of the season and relegated – their results were subsequently deleted from the Premiership's records.

Rule changes 

This season sees the final year of a three-year moratorium on relegation from the league to the RFU Championship.

This season is the second under the reduced salary cap regulations before changes are made before 2024–25. Further changes for this season are:
 Excluded players are reduced to one, with an exception made if a team has two excluded players contracts currently in place. If two excluded players remain contracted both remain excluded until the first of their contracts expire.

Teams 
For the second consecutive year, all of the teams from the previous season would initially compete in the league. Despite winning the RFU Championship in the 2021–22 season, Ealing Trailfinders were ineligible for promotion, after failing to meet the RFU minimum standards criteria. Therefore, the league continued to have 13 teams at the start of the season.

Worcester Warriors were suspended from all competitions on 26 September 2022 and then expelled on 6 October 2022, reducing the league to 12 teams.

Wasps were suspended from all competitions on 12 October 2022 and then expelled on 28 October 2022, reducing the league further to 11 teams.

Stadiums and locations

Table

Regular season 
The original fixtures for the season were announced by Premiership Rugby on 19 July 2022. The league season began on 10 September 2022 and the final will take place on 27 May 2023.

The regular season was initially set to play out over 26 rounds of six matches, with each of the 13 teams playing 24 times, plus two bye weeks. However, after the removal of Worcester Warriors and Wasps from the league, several teams experienced extra bye weeks due to the cancellation of fixtures against those two clubs. In response to the disrupted schedule, Premiership Rugby announced a revised fixture list for the second half of the season on 11 November 2022.

As a consequence of the revised fixtures, the league season now consists of 24 rounds of five games each, the last of which will take place on the first weekend of May. All 11 remaining teams will complete a total of 20 matches, with one bye week each in the second half of the season.

Highlights of the season include:
 Slater Cup – Leicester Tigers and Gloucester contest the inaugural Slater Cup at Mattioli Woods Welford Road on 24 December 2022, and at Kingsholm on 12 March 2023.
 Big Game 14 – Harlequins host Exeter Chiefs in this season's edition of The Big Game at Twickenham Stadium on 4 March 2023.
 The Showdown – Part 3 – Saracens host Harlequins in this season's edition of The Showdown at Tottenham Hotspur Stadium on 25 March 2023.
 Big Summer Kick-Off 2 – Harlequins host Bath in this season's edition of the Big Summer Kick-Off at Twickenham Stadium on 22 April 2023.

All fixtures are subject to change.

Round 1

Round 2

Round 3

Round 4

Round 5

Round 6

Round 7

Round 8

Round 9

Round 10

Round 11

Round 12

Round 13

Round 14

Round 15

Round 16

Round 17

Round 18

Round 19

Round 20

Round 21

Round 22

Round 23

Round 24

Play-offs 
As in previous seasons, the top four teams in the Premiership table, following the conclusion of the regular season, contest the play-off semi-finals in a 1st vs 4th and 2nd vs 3rd format, with the higher ranking team having home advantage. The two winners of the semi-finals then meet in the Premiership Final at Twickenham on 27 May 2023.

Semi-finals

Final

Leading scorers 
Note: Flags to the left of player names indicate national team as has been defined under World Rugby eligibility rules, or primary nationality for players who have not yet earned international senior caps. Players may hold one or more non-WR nationalities.

Most points 

Source:

Most tries 

Source:

Season attendances

Highest attendances

Awards

Player of the Month

Try of the Month

Notes

References

External links 
 

 
2022-23
1
England
1